Pets is a 1974 film starring Candice Rialson as a runaway who has various adventures.

Cast 
 Ed Bishop as Victor Stackman
 Joan Blackman as Geraldine Mills
 Candice Rialson as Bonnie
 Mike Cartel as Bonnie's brother
 K.T. Stevens as Mrs. Daubrey

Reception
According to Diabolique magazine "The main reason to watch it is Rialson, who has to carry the whole movie on her shoulders and is very impressive... she’s very natural on screen, comfortable with her body, believable in the role and sexy as hell, although she doesn’t get to show off her comic ability, so effective in later films."

See also 
 List of American films of 1974

References

Notes

External links 
 

1970s exploitation films
1970s English-language films
1970s road movies
American road movies
Films directed by Raphael Nussbaum
1970s American films